!Oka Tokat was a Philippine paranormal horror-action-thriller drama which originally aired on ABS-CBN from June 24, 1997 to May 7, 2002 every Tuesday night replacing Abangan ang Susunod na Kabanata. It starred Ricky Davao, Carmina Villaroel, Diether Ocampo, Jericho Rosales, Angelika Dela Cruz, Rica Peralejo, Paolo Contis, and Agot Isidro. Then later, Shaina Magdayao, Alwyn Uytingco, Joy Chiong, Jiro Manio and Emman Abeleda on its reformat of the series. Its title is the reverse spelling of the phrase Takot ako! (I'm scared!); hence, the exclamation point at the beginning. It was the longest-running horror-action-thriller series on Philippine television, every Tuesday nights right after the local drama TV series Esperanza. Later in November 2001, !Oka Tokat was later reformatted as a horror-comedy adventure series.

It was re-aired on ABS-CBN's cable channel, Jeepney TV. This series was also streaming on Jeepney TV's own YouTube Channel every 8:00 pm.

Plot

The show revolves around a media crew led by Rona del Fierro (played by Isidro) who investigate paranormal cases with the help del Fierro's premonitions. Most of the story arcs feature creatures in Filipino mythology, including the dwende (dwarf), tikbalang, diwata and the engkanto.

In the reformat, it revolves around a group of five children (portrayed by Magdayao, Uytingco, Chiong, Manio, and Abeleda) as they visit through numerous haunted places (e.g. Horror House).

Cast and characters

Main cast
Agot Isidro as Rona Catacutan del Fierro
Ricky Davao as Joaquin "Jack" Viloria 
Rica Peralejo as Richelou "Rikki" Montinola  (1997-2000)
Diether Ocampo as Benjamin "Benjie" Catacutan (1997-1999)
Jericho Rosales as Jeremiah "Jeremy" Tobias (1997-2000)
Angelika Dela Cruz as Tessa Sytangco (1997-1999)
Paolo Contis as Niccollo "Nico" Tobias  (1997-1999)
Carmina Villaroel as Carmela de Dios (2000-2001)
Bojo Molina as Yoyong Panaligan  (1999-2001)
Marc Solis as Marco Benitez (1997-2001)
Alessandra De Rossi as Teresa Gonzales (2001)
Lorena Garcia as Joy Montinola (1997-2001)
Giselle Sanchez as Magdalena "Dahlen" del Rosario (1997-2001)
Joy Viado as Ligaya "Tita Gaying" Montinola (1997-2001)
Nelson Evangelista as Daniel De Dios (2000-2001)

Extended cast
 G. Toengi as Melissa "Lizzie" Santiago 
 Janette McBride as Andrea "Andie" Santiago
 Zoren Legaspi as Brad Alcantara
 Tin Arnaldo as Abby (half human/half mermaid)
 Mel Martinez as Jigs Mendez
 Jeffrey Quizon as Lester
 Onemig Bondoc as Monty
 Meryll Soriano as Sofia Mendez (Cousin of Jigs)

Reformatted cast
 Shaina Magdayao as Twinkle
 Alwyn Uytingco
 Joy Chiong
 Jiro Manio
 Emman Abeleda as Kyle

Guest cast

 Marvin Agustin as Stephen
 Cherry Pie Picache as Michelle
 Glydel Mercado as Verna Vidal
 Rommel Montano as Satan
 Sheila Marie Rodriguez
 Wilson Go
 Jun Urbano
 Ching Arellano
 Lara Morena
 Dindi Gallardo
 Nanding Josef
 Perla Bautista
 Maricel Morales
 Noel Trinidad
 Joji Isla
 Luigi Alvarez
 Kaye Abad
 Michael Roy Journales
 Janus Del Prado
 Ronnie Quizon
 Joy Chiong 
 Ate Gay 
 Carol Banawa
 Flora Gasser
 Bentong
 Gary Lim
 Michael De Mesa
 Beth Tamayo
 Gina Pareño
 Assunta De Rossi
 Dimples Romana
 Baron Geisler
 Jestoni Alarcon as Ramon
 Emilio Garcia
 Richard Quan
 Sunshine Cruz
 Farrah Florer
 Ryan Eigenmann
 Adriana Agcaoili
 Janice De Belen
 Richard Arellano
 Nikki Valdez
 Daniel Fernando
 Susan Africa
 Raymond Bagatsing
 Chinggoy Alonzo
 Lailani Navarro
 Kristopher Peralta
 Boy 2 Quizon
 Jefferson Long
 Edward Dela Cruz
 Jomari Yllana
 Bong Regala
 Lui Villaruz
 John Lloyd Cruz
 Miguel Vera
 Connie Chua
 Eva Darren
 Doreen Bernal
 Rossana Jover
 Missy King
 Paula Peralejo
 Nonong De Andres
 Kuhol
 Steven Alonzo
 Jackie Castillejos
 Lucita Soriano
 Nante Montreal
 Andrea Del Rosario
 Gammy Viray
 Johnny Vicar 
 Aurora Halili
 Nikka Ruiz
 Alicia Alonzo
 Cris Villanueva
 Roi Rodrigo
 Rita Avila
 Vivian Foz
 Dominic Ochoa
 Diana Enriquez
 Desiree Del Valle
 Marithez Samson
 Ronalisa Cheng
 Eugene Domingo
 Allan Palileo
 Spanky Manikan
 Alma Lerma
 Tess Dumpit
 Lora Luna
 Troy Martino
 Jodi Sta. Maria
 Kier Legaspi
 Georgia Ortega
 Melissa Mendez
 Mel Kimura
 Elpidio Fetalino
 Ronnie Lazaro
 Celia Rodriguez
 Maila Gumila
 Lovely Rivero
 Reuben Manahan
 Denise Joaquin
 Ramon Christopher
 Mia Gutierrez
 JR Herrera
 Donnie Fernandez
 Carlo Muñoz
 Guila Alvarez
 Rez Cortez
 Anna Marin
 Lester Llansang
 BJ De Jesus
 Sharmaine Suarez
 Glenda Garcia
 Maureen Mauricio
 Gabby Eigenmann
 Jeffrey Santos
 Mark Vernal
 Miguel Dela Rosa
 Sylvia Sanchez
 Raffy Bonanza
 John Prats
 Charlie Davao
 Ernie Zarate
 Rudy Meyer
 Camille Prats
 Kristine Hermosa
 Marianne Dela Riva
 Paolo Zobel
 Rita Magdalena
 Kathleen Hermosa
 Cris Daluz
 Carmi Martin
 Eric Quizon
 Jennifer Mendoza
 Niño Muhlach
 Gina Alajar
 Albert Martinez
 Rustom Padilla
 Chin Chin Gutierrez
 Jennifer Sevilla
 Evangeline Pascual
 Dennis Baltazar
 Yayo Aguila
 Jean Garcia
 Robert Arevalo
 Lara Fabregas
 Eula Valdez
 Brando Legaspi
 Charlon Davao
 Winnie Cordero
 Ray Ventura
 Teresa Loyzaga
 Dante Rivero
 Joel Torre
 Pinky Amador
 Daria Ramirez
 Jao Mapa
 Tonton Gutierrez
 Vangie Labalan
 Patrick Garcia
 Stefano Mori
 William Martinez
 Liza Ranillo
 Philip Lazaro
 Rommel Padilla
 Crispin Pineda
 Stella Ruiz
 Joe Gruta
 Tanya Garcia
 Boots Anson-Roa
 Jeffrey Hidalgo
 Symon Soler
 Raquel Montesa
 Pocholo Montes
 Ricky Belmonte
 Hero Bautista
 Gladys Reyes
 Isabel Rivas
 Kevin Vernal
 Jean Saburit
 Bernard Palanca
 Vhong Navarro
 John Arcilla
 Ogie Diaz
 Pen Medina
 Caridad Sanchez
 Elizabeth Oropesa
 Carlo Aquino
 Tracy Vergel
 Mon Confiado
 Mark Gil
 Allan Paule as Eduardo
 Dick Israel
 Angel Aquino
 Suzette Ranillo
 Maria Isabel Lopez
 Manjo Del Mundo
 Mike Magat
 Odette Khan
 Archie Adamos
 Aya Medel
 Augusto Victa
 Lito Legaspi
 Ian Veneracion
 Victor Neri
 Nonie Buencamino
 Katrina De Leon
 Corrine Mendez
 Kristine Bondoc
 Efren Reyes Jr.
 Kris Aquino
 Ricardo Cepeda
 Berting Labra
 Dindo Arroyo
 Luis Gonzales
 Carding Castro
 Romeo Rivera
 Tanya Gomez
 Ama Quiambao
 Lui Manansala
 Gloria Sevilla
 Marita Zobel
 Mely Tagasa
 Anita Linda
 Malou De Guzman
 Arlene Tolibas
 Ces Quesada
 Christopher Roxas
 Sherilyn Reyes
 Chuck Perez
 Klaudia Koronel
 Bing Davao
 Vandolph
 Roy Alvarez
 Romnick Sarmienta
 Jaime Fabregas
 Bembol Roco
 Lito Pimentel
 Jaclyn Jose
 Gardo Versoza
 Bella Flores
 Gio Alvarez
 Ana Capri
 Via Veloso
 Al Tantay
 Lee Robin Salazar
 Chat Silayan-Baylon
 Smokey Manaloto
 Jake Roxas
 Lloyd Samartino
 Amy Austria
 Julia Clarete
 Jay Manalo
 Tony Mabesa
 Eric Fructuoso
 Olive Isidro
 Serena Dalrymple
 Carlos Agassi
 CJ Ramos
 Cheska Garcia
 Spencer Reyes
 Miggy Tanchangco
 Gerard Fainsan
 Gerard Pizarras
 Princess Schuck
 Monina Bagatsing
 Victoria Haynes
 Tommy Abuel
 Juan Rodrigo
 Jackie Lou Blanco
 Rosemarie Gil
 Anton Bernardo
 Angelica Panganiban
 Johnny Delgado
 Leandro Muñoz
 Romy Sison
 Manilyn Reynes
 John Lapus
 Aljon Jimenez
 Hilda Koronel
 Cherie Gil
 Krista Ranillo
 Mark Anthony Fernandez
 Ian De Leon
 Mat Ranillo III
 Mymy Davao
 Menggie Cobarrubias
 Alvin Anson
 Amy Perez
 Pilar Pilapil
 Sharmaine Arnaiz
 Gino Paul Guzman
 Maritoni Fernandez
 Ramil Rodriguez
 Tirso Cruz III
 Gilleth Sandico
 Lilia Cuntapay
 Dennis Padilla
 Eagle Riggs
 Whitney Tyson
 Luz Fernandez
 Leandro Baldemor
 Roldan Aquino
 Rio Locsin
 Eddie Gutierrez
 Matthew Mendoza
 Bernardo Bernardo
 Diego Salvador
 Toby Alejar
 Mailes Kanapi
 Jolina Magdangal
 Marilyn Villamayor
 Romy Diaz
 Ruel Vernal
 Wilma Doesnt
 John Regala
 Julio Diaz
 Manny Castañeda
 Carlos Morales
 Jon Santos
 Marissa Sanchez
 Jon Achaval
 Melanie Marquez
 Beverly Salviejo
 Soliman Cruz
 Chuckie Dreyfus
 Isabel Granada
 Marissa Delgado
 Candy Pangilinan
 Mylene Dizon
 Mandy Ochoa
 Anna Larrucea
 Bearwin Meily
 Roderick Paulate
 Nova Villa
 Tiya Pusit
 Ana Roces
 Dido Dela Paz
 Irma Adlawan
 Edu Manzano
 Patrick Dela Rosa
 Allen Dizon
 Sammy Lagmay
 Yul Servo
 Leo Martinez
 Gloria Romero
 Lou Veloso
 Gloria Diaz
 Ronaldo Valdez
 Ruffa Gutierrez
 Rosanna Roces
 Pops Fernandez
 Nanette Inventor 
 Mitch Valdez
 Alfred Labatos
 Robert Ortega
 Bobby Andrews
 Wowie De Guzman
 Timmy Cruz
 Tetchie Agbayani
 John Estrada
 Jess Lapid
 Isko Moreno
 Jhong Hilario
 Mystica

Sequel

In 2011, ABS-CBN announced that !Oka Tokat will have its sequel entitled "Oka2kat". It was supposed to be aired in March 2011 but it was delayed to February 4, 2012.  The sequel does not focus on the previous characters but has the same genre.

See also
 List of programs aired by ABS-CBN
List of programs broadcast by Jeepney TV

Footnotes

References

1997 Philippine television series debuts
2002 Philippine television series endings
ABS-CBN drama series
Philippine horror fiction television series
Filipino-language television shows
Television shows set in the Philippines
Television series by Star Creatives